Remsoft is a Canadian provider of asset management and asset optimization solutions for forestry, natural resource, environmental, transportation, and infrastructure assets "to help them manage long-term priority and financial planning." The company was founded in 1992 by Andrea Feunekes, CEO, and Ugo Feunekes, CTO and is headquartered in Fredericton, New Brunswick, Canada.It was named a Gartner Cool Vendor in 2011.

Technology
Remsoft’s technology uses a combination of Metamodeling, Business process modeling and Heuristic analysis to analyze variables and arrive at preferred outcomes.  The most recent updates to its technology platform were released in December 2018.

Management 
On 9 July 2020, Remsoft has confirmed Corinne Watson 's role as General Manager, Asia Pacific. In her position she will help on-the-ground consumer satisfaction and accelerate development in the Australasia region.

Customers
The company’s customers include:
 American Forestry Management
 Department of Transportation (New Brunswick)
 Forestry Tasmania
 Washington Department of Natural Resources

Services 

 Road Optimizer Assessment Service - road planning.
 Model Integration Service - free up the time to work on more critical studies.
 Model Audit Service - offers professional feedback and suggestions on model development and opportunities for change.
 Enhanced Support Service - provides an expanded service standard that goes above that provided by Annual Maintenance and Support.

Source:

References

External links 
 

Companies based in Fredericton
Companies established in 1992
Software companies of Canada